Architecture was a monthly magazine.

History
In 1899, The American Institute of Architects Quarterly Bulletin  was authorized.

In April 1900, The American Institute of Architects Quarterly Bulletin first issue appeared.

In 1913, Journal of the American Institute of Architects (Vol. #1 - Issue #1) began, replacing the Quarterly Bulletin.

In 1929, The Octagon began, replacing the "Journal of the American Institute of Architects".

In 1944, Journal of the American Institute of Architects began, replacing "The Octagon".

In 1957, AIA Journal began, replacing the "Journal of the American Institute of Architects". 

In August 1976, publication of the AIA Journal ended. Then, Architecture was the official magazine of the American Institute of Architects.

In 1996, the Progressive Architecture magazine name and subscriber list was sold to BPI Communications, by Penton Publishing.

Until the end of 1996, Architecture, owned by BPI Communications, was the official magazine of the American Institute of Architects.

In 1997, Architectural Record became the official magazine of the American Institute of Architects.  

In 2006, Architecture magazine was purchased and closed by Hanley-Wood, which replaced the magazine with a new title, Architect Magazine.

See also
 List_of_architecture_magazines#United_States

References

External links
 Architecture: the AIA journal, BPI Communications, Inc.
Cover of Architecture Magazine by Kirk Gittings Photography

Visual arts magazines published in the United States
Monthly magazines published in the United States
Architecture magazines
Magazines established in 1983
Magazines disestablished in 2006
Defunct magazines published in the United States
Magazines published in Washington, D.C.